A person who is said to have a stiff upper lip displays fortitude and stoicism in the face of adversity, or exercises great self-restraint in the expression of emotion. The phrase is most commonly heard as part of the idiom "keep a stiff upper lip", and has traditionally been used to describe an attribute of British people in remaining resolute and unemotional when faced with adversity. , hence the saying keep a "stiff" upper lip.

Examples
The following have often been cited as exemplifying the "stiff upper lip".
 Sir Francis Drake finishing a game of bowls before embarking on the defeat of the Spanish Armada in 1588.
 During the Battle of Waterloo, the Earl of Uxbridge's calm assessment of his injuries (he had lost his leg) to the Duke of Wellington after being hit by a cannonball.
 Rudyard Kipling's poem If—, first published in 1910.
 In 1852, during the sinking of the HMS Birkenhead soldiers famously stood in ranks on board, allowing the women and children to board the boats safely and escape the sinking.
 In 1912, during the Terra Nova Expedition, Captain Lawrence Oates, aware that his own ill health was compromising his three companions' chances of survival, calmly leaving the tent and choosing certain death saying, "I am just going outside and may be some time."
 In 1912, Captain Edward Smith directing the evacuation of the RMS Titanic before going down with the ship.
 Major Allison Digby Tatham-Warter, who would wear a bowler hat and carry an umbrella into battle in the Second World War, most famously at the battle for Arnhem Bridge.
 In 1982, Captain Moody aboard British Airways Flight 9 from London to Auckland, on realising that all engines of the aircraft have stopped because of volcanic ash, announced to the passengers, "We have a small problem. All four engines have stopped. We are doing our damnedest to get them going again. I trust you are not in too much distress."
 In 1989, United Airlines Flight 232 suffered a catastrophic engine failure that rendered all hydraulics inoperable, resulting in the aircraft being virtually uncontrollable, with the exception of the engine throttles. Captain Al Haynes kept a healthy sense of self-deprecating humour throughout the ordeal, which could clearly be heard on the cockpit voice recorder. The crew, along with passengers who were off-duty pilots and flight engineers, managed to crash land the aircraft at Sioux Gateway Airport. In simulation scenarios, no crew has ever been able to make it to the airport, and the event is often cited as one of the best examples of crew resource management in an emergency situation.

Origins
The idea of the stiff upper lip is traced back to Ancient Greece – to the Spartans, whose cult of discipline and self-sacrifice was a source of inspiration to the English public school system; and to the Stoics. Stoic ideas were adopted by the Romans, particularly the Emperor Marcus Aurelius, who wrote, "If you are distressed by any external thing, it is not this thing which disturbs you, but your own judgment about it. And it is in your power to wipe out that judgment now." The concept reached England in the 1590s, and featured in the plays of William Shakespeare; his tragic hero Hamlet says, "There is nothing either good or bad but thinking makes it so". Poems that feature a memorable evocation of Victorian stoicism and a stiff upper lip include Rudyard Kipling's "If—" and W. E. Henley's "Invictus". The phrase became symbolic of the British people, and particularly of those who were students of the English public school system during the Victorian era. Such schools were heavily influenced by stoicism, and aimed to instil a code of discipline and devotion to duty in their pupils through 'character-building' competitive sports (as immortalised in the poem "Vitai Lampada"), corporal punishments and cold showers.

See also

References

Further reading

External links 

The British Stiff Upper Lip at Sterlingtimes Virtual Scrapbook of British Nostalgia 
"Decorum is dead! Long live the outburst!" Salon article on the topic
UsingEnglish.com

Emotion
English-language idioms
British culture
English culture
Metaphors referring to body parts
Positive psychology
Words and phrases describing personality